Good Robot is a 2016 multidirectional shooter video game developed and published by Pyrodactyl Games. The game was released for Microsoft Windows on April 5, 2016.

Gameplay 
Good Robot is a shoot 'em up where players assume the role of the last good robot of PyroCorp fighting on procedurally generated levels against the defective robots that decided to exterminate humanity. For each destroyed robot, the player earns money that can be used for upgrades or to buy hats that grant invulnerability for one hit.

Development 
In 2013, Shamus Young made a prototype of a 2D shooter inspired by titles like Descent. However, Young decided to cancel the project in 2014. The following year, Pyrodactyl contacted him to finish the game. The game was released on April 5, 2016 on Steam. It was also planned to be released on GOG.com, but it was rejected. A Linux version was also in the plans, but it was cancelled. On August 3, 2020, Arvind Raja Yadav from Pyrodactyl Games released the source code for the game under the MIT License on GitHub.

Reception 

Good Robot received "mixed" reviews according to the review aggregation website Metacritic. IGN India gave it a score of 8/10, criticizing the lack of local multiplayer and an arcade mode.

References

External links 

2016 video games
Cancelled Linux games
Commercial video games with freely available source code
Indie video games
Multidirectional shooters
Open-source video games
Roguelike video games
Shooter video games
Single-player video games
Software using the MIT license
Video games about robots
Video games developed in India
Video games developed in the United States
Video games set in 2031
Windows games
Windows-only games